Lac-Alfred is an unorganized territory in the Bas-Saint-Laurent region of Quebec, Canada.

Situated in the Matapédia Valley, it is named after the small Lake Alfred in the northwestern part of the territory. The lake rests at the foot of Mont Saint-Pierre, which reaches  and is also known as Montagne du Radar (Radar Mountain) or Montagne de la Tour (Tower Mountain) due to an old fire tower or lookout that was built upon it.

The territory is used extensively for logging.

See also
 List of unorganized territories in Quebec

Notes

References

Unorganized territories in Bas-Saint-Laurent
La Matapédia Regional County Municipality